Le Beau Mariage (The Good Marriage) is a 1982 French film directed by Éric Rohmer, starring Béatrice Romand, André Dussollier, Féodor Atkine. It is one of Rohmer's "comedies and proverbs" (comédies et proverbes). Its theme is a proverb from La Fontaine: "Quel esprit ne bat la campagne? Qui ne fait château en Espagne?" (that is, "Who doesn't daydream? Who doesn't build castles in the air?").

Synopsis 

Sabine, an art history student, is growing tired of being the mistress of a married painter, Simon. She meets Edmond, handsome, young, rich and single, and declares that she is going to marry him.

Reception
On Rotten Tomatoes, the film has an approval rating of 92% based on reviews from 12 critics. FrenchFilms.org gave it 4 out of 5.

Tom Milne for Sight and Sound wrote: "It was perhaps high time that one of the delightful women who have led Rohmer's heroes such a teasing dance was put in her place."
Vincent Canby of The New York Times gave it 4.5 out of 5 and wrote: "The scope of Le Beau Mariage is limited, but everything within it is well-defined and magically, unexpectedly, illuminating."

Release 
The film is available in the US via the Xfinity streaming service.

References

External links 
 

1982 films
1982 comedy-drama films
French comedy-drama films
Films directed by Éric Rohmer
Films produced by Margaret Ménégoz
1980s French films